Kentucky Route 155 (KY 155) is a  state highway in the U.S. state of Kentucky. The route originates at a junction with U.S. Route 31E and US 150 (Bardstown Road) in Louisville, Kentucky. On the other side of intersection, KY 155 becomes a local road called Trevilian Way. KY 155 continues through several Louisville suburbs to Jeffersontown, Kentucky and into Spencer County, where it eventually merges with Kentucky Route 55 a few miles north of Taylorsville, Kentucky.

It is known locally as Taylorsville Road from its northern terminus until a junction with Kentucky Route 148 in Jefferson County, where it is known as Taylorsville Lake Road until reaching its southern terminus. Despite what its two local names would suggest, KY 155 itself does not actually reach either Taylorsville Lake or Taylorsville, but through connecting roads it is the primary non-interstate link between Louisville and both of those locations.

It is 4 to 6 lanes through much of Jefferson County, and is a major thoroughfare connecting Louisville's inner east side neighborhoods with suburban shopping and business areas, such as the Hurstbourne Parkway corridor. It interchanges with both I-264 and I-265.

History

KY 155's history is relatively lengthy, the intersection with Bardstown Road (once called the Bardstown Turnpike) was originally known as Doup's Point, the home of a major Louisville family. In 1848 legislation was passed authorizing the construction of a spur route from the Bardstown Turnpike near Doup's Point to Taylorsville, by way of Jeffersontown. The route, initially called the Louisville and Taylorsville Pike, was completed by the late 19th century and was expanded to 4 lanes in the 1960s. In the early 1990s, as a part of improvements to I-264 and its interchanges, KY 155 was widened to 6 lanes south of the interchange and local access roads were built parallel to it, to provide easier access for residents whose driveways had previously opened onto the highway.

Major intersections

See also
Roads in Louisville, Kentucky

References

External links

State Primary Road System in Jefferson County
State Primary Road System in Spencer County

0155
0155
Transportation in Spencer County, Kentucky
Transportation in Jefferson County, Kentucky
Jeffersontown, Kentucky